Chris Cutler (born 4 January 1947) is an English percussionist, composer, lyricist and music theorist. Best known for his work with English avant-rock group Henry Cow, Cutler was also a member and drummer of other bands, including Art Bears, News from Babel, Pere Ubu and (briefly) Gong/Mothergong. He has collaborated with many musicians and groups, including Fred Frith, Lindsay Cooper, Zeena Parkins, Peter Blegvad, Telectu and The Residents, and has appeared on over 100 recordings. Cutler's career spans over four decades and he still performs actively throughout the world.

Cutler created and runs the British independent record label Recommended Records and is the editor of its sound-magazine, RēR Quarterly. He has given a number of public lectures on music, published numerous articles and papers, and written a book on the political theory of contemporary music, File Under Popular (1984). Cutler also assembled and released The 40th Anniversary Henry Cow Box Set (2009), a collection of over 10 hours of previously unreleased recordings by the band.

Biography
Chris Cutler was born in January 1947 in Washington, D.C. to a British intelligence officer and his Austrian wife. In 1948 the family moved to England, where Cutler was brought up. He never studied music but tried his hand at banjo, guitar, trumpet and flute while at school. He finally settled for drums "because I wanted to be in a band and drummers were scarcest." Cutler formed his first band in 1963, playing Shadows and Ventures instrumental covers, then played in several R&B and soul bands. In 1966 he joined a band called Louise, with Tony Durant (later of Fuchsia), which performed on the London psychedelic club circuit for three years before breaking up. Looking for work, Cutler placed a series of advertisements in Melody Maker over a period of nine months in 1970. This put him in touch with a number of musicians which led to Cutler and keyboardist Dave Stewart of Egg forming The Ottawa Music Company, a 26 piece rock composer's orchestra, in 1971. Soon afterwards, Henry Cow, looking to replace the drummer who had just left them, responded to one of Cutler's adverts and invited him to a rehearsal.

Henry Cow

Henry Cow had been formed in 1968 by Cambridge University students Fred Frith (guitar) and Tim Hodgkinson (woodwind and keyboards). By 1971 the band had gone through a number of personnel changes and it was only when Cutler joined them in September 1971 that the group stabilised. Frith, Hodgkinson and Cutler became Henry Cow's permanent core until the band split up in 1978.

Henry Cow's prominence in progressive rock circles launched the careers of many of its members, including Cutler's.  Their music was uncompromising and this eventually put them at odds with the mainstream music business, forcing the band to do everything themselves: from recording, manufacturing and releasing their own albums, to organising their own tours and being their own management and agency. All this proved invaluable experience for Cutler that would assist him greatly in his future endeavours. The group spent most of its last three years touring Europe and many of Cutler's future collaborations resulted from contact made with musicians on these tours. In Henry Cow's last few months they initiated Rock in Opposition (RIO), a collective of like-minded bands they had encountered through Europe that were united in their opposition to the music industry.

Recommended Records

After Henry Cow disbanded in 1978, Cutler created Recommended Records in London, an independent label and distribution network for RIO artists. The record label quickly filled the gap left by commercial labels and soon began to also release non-RIO bands and musicians. Recommended Records's aim was to produce records of high technical and musical quality, placing the musicians' interests first and profits second. This strategy, however, led to the label experiencing financial difficulties from time to time, but it stuck to its principles and has survived for over 25 years. There are a number of musicians whose work would never have seen the light of day had it not been for Cutler's label.

Cutler also founded November Books in 1982, the publishing wing of Recommended Records.

Other bands and projects
Cutler's first post-Henry Cow project was Art Bears (1978–1981), a group formed by Cutler, and fellow Henry Cow members, Fred Frith (guitar and keyboards) and Dagmar Krause (vocals), six months before Henry Cow split up. Art Bears were a song-oriented group that recorded three studio albums. Cutler's main contributions were the songs' texts and (with Frith) the album productions. Art Bears (in the wake of Henry Cow) were well received by critics which further boosted Cutler's reputation in "progressive" circles.

In 1982, Cutler co-founded the Anglo-German group Cassiber (1982–1992) with German musicians Heiner Goebbels, Alfred Harth and Christoph Anders. Over the next ten years Cassiber produced five albums and toured Europe, Asia, South and North America. Their music was very experimental and often involved spontaneously improvising pre-existing structured and arranged material.

In 1983, Cutler formed News from Babel (1983–1986), another song-orientated group with core members Cutler, Lindsay Cooper (from Henry Cow), Zeena Parkins (a United States harpist) and Dagmar Krause. With guest musicians (including Robert Wyatt and Sally Potter) they made two critically acclaimed studio albums, but did not perform live.

Cutler was a member of the United States experimental rock band Pere Ubu between 1987 and 1989. He had first encountered them in Washington DC in 1978 while exploring the possibility of Henry Cow touring America (which never materialised as Henry Cow disbanded soon after). Cutler kept in touch with Pere Ubu until they split in the early 1980s and their singer, David Thomas began a solo career. Cutler and Lindsay Cooper joined Thomas in 1982 to form David Thomas and the Pedestrians, and for the next three years they toured Europe and North America and made two albums. Over the next few years, some of the ex-Pere Ubu members began joining Thomas's Pedestrians. Cooper left in 1985 and by 1987 the group (now called David Thomas and the Wooden Birds) was effectively Pere Ubu again. As Pere Ubu, the band (with Cutler) made two albums. Cutler left in 1989, but was credited as a co-writer on the band's 1991 album World in Collision for several songs written during his tenure.

In 1991, Cutler and German composer Lutz Glandien recorded the critically acclaimed song project Domestic Stories. Cutler wrote the song texts and played drums, while Glandien composed and performed the music with samplers and computers. The supporting musicians were Dagmar Krause (vocals), Fred Frith (bass and guitar) and Alfred Harth (saxophone and clarinet). Cutler collaborated with Glandien again in 1994 to record Scenes from no Marriage and to participate in p53, a commission for the 25th Frankfurt Jazz Festival with Zygmunt Krauze, Marie Goyette, Otomo Yoshihide.

The (ec) Nudes were a band Cutler, Wädi Gysi (guitar) and Amy Denio (vocals, bass, saxophone, accordion) formed in 1993. The trio recorded Vanishing Point, a CD of songs with texts by Cutler and music by Gysi and Denio, and toured all over Europe and visited Brasil. Bob Drake later joined the group on bass and as a quartet they toured all over Europe, Canada and Brazil, but did not record. Cutler left the group in 1994.

Cutler and Yugoslav keyboardist and composer Stevan Tickmayer formed The Science Group in 1997 to record A Mere Coincidence (1999), an album of songs on science topics, including quantum mechanics. Cutler wrote the texts, Tickmayer composed the music, and the rest of the group comprised Bob Drake (bass guitar, vocals) and Claudio Puntin (bass clarinet), with guests Amy Denio (vocals) and Fred Frith (guitar). In 2003 Cutler and Tickmayer reconstituted The Science Group as a quartet with Bob Drake (bass guitar) and Mike Johnson (guitars), and released an instrumental album, Spoors. In 1998, he joined John Wolf Brennan's sextet "HeXtet" to record a series of poetry settings, from Edgar Allan Poe to contemporary Irish poets like Theo Dorgan and Paula Meehan, together with legendary singer Julie Tippetts, saxophonist Evan Parker, trombonist Paul Rutherford and clarinetist Peter Whyman.

Other collaborations

The ex-Henry Cow members have always maintained close contact with each other and Cutler still collaborates with many of them. Cutler and Fred Frith have been touring Europe, Asia and the Americas since 1978 and have given over 100 duo performances. Four albums from some of these concerts have been released. In December 2006, Cutler, Frith and Tim Hodgkinson performed together at The Stone in New York City, only their second concert performance since Henry Cow's demise in 1978. Cutler, John Greaves and Geoff Leigh formed The Artaud Beats with Yumi Hara. Cutler and Hara also work together in Half the Sky, a band formed in 2015 to play the music of former Henry Cow member Lindsay Cooper, principally pieces she wrote for News from Babel and Henry Cow. The band have performed in Japan, France, the UK and Germany.

On 4 November 2006 Cutler, Jon Rose (violin) and Zeena Parkins (harp) performed with the BBC Scottish Symphony Orchestra conducted by Ilan Volkov, at the Glasgow City Halls in Glasgow, Scotland. The concert was recorded and later broadcast by BBC Radio 3 on 24 March 2007.

Other musicians and bands Cutler has performed and recorded with over the years include Tim Hodgkinson, Lindsay Cooper, Peter Blegvad, John Greaves, René Lussier, Jean Derome, Tom Cora, Aksak Maboul, The Residents, The Work, Duck and Cover, Les 4 Guitaristes de l'Apocalypso-Bar, Kalahari Surfers, Hail, Biota and Brainville 3.

In 2009, Cutler toured North America with avant-garde Czech violinist Iva Bittová.
In 2015 he collaborated with Alfred Harth founding a group Hope, a commission for the 46th Frankfurt Jazz Festival with Kazuhisa Uchihashi, Mitsuru Nasuno.

Solo performances
Since the late 1990s, Cutler began giving solo electrified percussion performances to audiences across the world. His first was in Tokyo in June 1998, which was recorded in a documentary film, At the Edge of Chaos (also known as 12 June 1998), by award-winning film director Shinji Aoyama. The first part of the film is equipment set-up and sound-checks, plus interviews with Cutler, while the second part is the improvised concert itself.

In 2001 Cutler released Solo: A Descent Into the Maelstrom, an album of solos on his electrified drum kit taken from live performances in Europe and the United States between August 2000 and May 2001. In 2005 he released Twice Around the World, an album of real-time recordings made from all over the world between 23.30 and midnight GMT. The material was taken from a daily half-hour radio programme Cutler ran for Resonance FM: Out of the Blue Radio between July 2001 and July 2002. A companion album, There and Back Again, comprising 44 environmental recordings, was released by Cutler in 2006.

Electrified drum kit
Chris Cutler never studied music and taught himself drumming on makeshift drum kits assembled with whatever was on hand. He slowly developed a technique using a "top-down" approach as opposed to the traditional "bottom-up" approach used by schooled drummers. Drummers are first taught basic patterns which are later combined into more complex patterns. Cutler learned the opposite way, hearing or imagining a sound and then disciplining his hands and feet to reproduce it. This "top-down" approach resulted in a unique style of drumming that pervades all of Cutler's performances and recordings.

By the time Cutler was drumming for Henry Cow in 1971, he had become a perfectly competent, albeit unconventional, drummer. The nature of Henry Cow was to experiment and explore and it was here that Cutler developed and refined his drumming techniques. It was also here that he started to electrify his drum kit. He began by attaching old telephone mouthpieces to drums and cymbals, and connecting them to an amplifier and a reverb unit. He later added a small mixer for four independent inputs. The effect was very basic: a few low-grade inputs with only equalisation and reverberation to manipulate.

By 1982, Cutler had added another small mixer, a pitch shifter and a delay unit. He had also begun using cheap guitar transducers and a table full of additional wired objects (pans, metal trays, small tambours and egg-slicers).

Cutler experimented briefly with drum pads triggered to play sampled or synthesized sounds, but quickly dismissed this option because he found them unresponsive and inflexible. They reduced a drum to nothing more than a switch: hit it and a pre-programmed sound is emitted, irrespective of how hard or in what manner the drum is struck. Cutler preferred real-time processing: amplifying and modifying actual sounds produced by the drum, making it a kind of an electroacoustic instrument, immediate and responsive, and retaining all the qualities of an acoustic drum kit.

Cutler went on to wire his entire drum kit, using a 16 channel mixer with multi-effect processors, a "Space pedal", a "Whammy pedal", a PDS 8000 and an old Boss pitch shifter/delay unit. In addition to transducers, he also attached miniature microphones to some of the drums and sticks. Cutler introduced feedback into the mix by placing a monitor speaker near the kit.

The electrified drum kit continues to evolve and to Cutler it is "satisfyingly unpredictable", responsive to all his old techniques while continuing to generate new ones. It has a unique "voice" that Cutler still has not plumbed the depths of. This is what prompted him to start giving solo performances because it tested his skill at playing an instrument he had to treat as an equal and evolve with.

Writings and talks

Talks
In the early 1980s, Chris Cutler became active in the International Association for the Study of Popular Music (IASPM) and started giving talks and participating in symposia throughout the world. Some of the talks he has given are:
"Composing with Other People's Music – Creativity or Theft?", British Council, Belgrade.
"Electrification and Experimentation, the Development of New Musical Resources in the Popular Field", Union of Composers, Moscow.
"Improvisation: Motives and Methods", IASPM, University of Leeds.
"Rock in Opposition, a case study". Academy of Science, Berlin.
"Studio Composition and Visualisation" – a case study IASPM, University, Montreal
"Sonic and Structural Convergence at the fringes of Musical Genres". The Royal College of Art, London.
"On The Impact of Recording Technology on Popular music." Pomeriggi Musicali do Milano.
"Plunderphonics and Postmodernism", Dissonanten, Rotterdam.
"Sampling and Plunderphonics", Museum School, Boston.
"The Recording Studio as a Compositional Instrument", The Royal College of Art, London.

Essays
Cutler has written and published a number of essays on music, including:
"Necessity and Choice in Musical Forms: Concerning Musical and Technical Means and Political Needs" (1990) – an essay on the evolution of recorded music, published in The Cassette Mythos.
"Plunderphonia" (1994) – an essay on plunderphonics, published in Musicworks 60.
"Scale" (1997) – an essay on the scale of sounds in music, published in The Gramophone Special Edition "Perspectives on Contemporary Music".
"Thoughts on Music and the Avant Garde" (2005) – an essay commissioned for a book dedicated to Professor Gunther Mayer, published in Perfect Sound Forever.
"Locality" (2006) – published in Resonance Magazine.
"The Road to Plunderphonia" (2011) – published by Quaderns d'àudio/Ràdio Web MACBA.

Radio broadcasts
From 2012, Cutler has been producing a series of podcasts/lectures entitled "Probes" that examine the history of music from the invention of sound recording to the present day. The series was commissioned by the Museum of Modern Art, Barcelona, and published and broadcast by Quaderns d'àudio/Ràdio Web MACBA.

Podcast transcripts:

"Probes 1" (20 August 2012)
"Probes 1.2 Auxiliaries" (18 October 2012)
"Probes 2" (3 December 2012)
"Probes 2.2 Auxiliaries" (23 January 2013)
"Probes 3" (25 February 2013)
"Probes 3.2 Auxiliaries" (9 May 2013)
"Probes 4" (25 June 2013)
"Probes 4.2 Auxiliaries" (22 July 2013)
"Probes 5" (27 August 2013)
"Probes 5.2 Auxiliaries" (30 September 2013)
"Probes 6" (21 November 2013)
"Probes 6.2 Auxiliaries" (19 December 2013)
"Probes 7" (30 January 2014)
"Probes 7.2 Auxiliaries" (24 April 2014)
"Probes 8" (14 July 2014)
"Probes 8.2 Auxiliaries" (8 August 2014)
"Probes 9" (30 September 2014)
"Probes 9.2 Auxiliaries" (6 November 2014)
"Probes 10" (15 December 2014)
"Probes 10.2 Auxiliaries" (27 January 2015)
"Probes 11" (11 March 2015)
"Probes 12" (30 April 2015)
"Probes 12.2 Auxiliaries" (25 May 2015)
"Probes 13" (9 June 2015)
"Probes 13.2 Auxiliaries" (10 August 2015)
"Probes 14" (15 September 2015)
"Probes 15" (19 October 2015)
"Probes 15.2 Auxiliaries" (3 December 2015)
"Probes 16" (14 January 2016)
"Probes 16.2 Auxiliaries" (1 February 2016)
"Probes 17" (26 February 2016)
"Probes 17.2 Auxiliaries" (8 March 2016)
"Probes 18" (29 April 2016)
"Probes 18.2 Auxiliaries" (5 August 2016)
"Probes 19" (3 September 2016)
"Probes 19.2 Auxiliaries" (23 November 2016)
"Probes 20" (2 January 2017)
"Probes 20.2 Auxiliaries" (18 April 2017)
"Probes 21" (4 September 2017)
"Probes 21.2 Auxiliaries" (21 November 2017)
"Probes 22" (22 January 2018)
"Probes 22.2 Auxiliaries" (20 February 2018)
"Probes 23" (29 March 2018)
"Probes 23.2 Auxiliaries" (9 May 2018)
"Probes 24.2 Auxiliaries" (30 January 2019)
"Probes 25" (23 April 2019)
"Probes 26" (1 July 2019)
"Probes 26.2 Auxiliaries" (11 February 2020)

Books
Cutler has also published three books:
The Henry Cow Book (co-authored with Tim Hodgkinson) (1981) – a collection of documents and information about the band.
File Under Popular (1984) – a collection of theoretical and critical writings on music, also published in Polish, German and Japanese.
Not as We Choose (2020) – a further collection of theoretical and critical writings on music, illustrated by Peter Blegvad.

Discography
Here is a selection of albums Chris Cutler has performed on, showing the year they were first released:

Bands and projects
With Henry Cow
 Legend (1973, LP, Virgin Records, UK)
 Unrest (1974, LP, Virgin, UK)
 Concerts (1976, 2xLP, Caroline Records, UK)
 Western Culture (1979, LP, Broadcast, UK)
 The Virgin Years – Souvenir Box (1991, 3xCD, East Side Digital Records, US)
 Henry Cow Box (2006, 7xCD, Recommended Records, UK)
 Stockholm & Göteborg (2008, CD, Recommended Records, UK)
 The 40th Anniversary Henry Cow Box Set (2009, 9xCD+DVD, Recommended Records, UK)
 The Henry Cow Box Redux: The Complete Henry Cow (2019, 17xCD+DVD, Recommended Records, UK)
With Henry Cow/Slapp Happy
Desperate Straights (1975, LP, Virgin Records, UK)
In Praise of Learning (1975, LP, Virgin Records, UK)
With Art Bears
Hopes and Fears (1978, LP, Recommended Records, UK)
Winter Songs (1979, LP, Recommended Records, UK)
The World as It Is Today (1981, LP, Recommended Records, UK)
The Art Box (2004, 6xCD, Recommended Records, UK)
With The Residents
Eskimo (1979, LP, Ralph Records, USA)
Commercial Album (1980, LP, Ralph Records, USA)
With Aksak Maboul
Un Peu de l'Âme des Bandits (1980, LP, Crammed Discs, Belgium)
With Cassiber
Man or Monkey? (1982, 2xLP, Riskant, Germany)
Beauty and the Beast (1984, LP, Recommended Records, UK)
Perfect Worlds (1986, LP, Recommended Records, UK)
A Face We All Know (1990, CD, Recommended Records, UK)
Live in Tokyo (1998, 2xCD, Recommended Records, UK)
With The Work
Live in Japan (1982, LP, Recommended Records, Japan)
With Fred Frith
Live in Prague and Washington, (1983, LP, Recommended Records, UK) – 1990 CD release retitled Live in Moscow, Prague & Washington
Live in Trondheim, Berlin & Limoges, Vol. 2 (1994, CD, Recommended Records, UK)
2 Gentlemen in Verona (2000, CD, Recommended Records, UK)
The Stone: Issue Two (2007, CD, Tzadik Records, US)
With Lindsay Cooper, Bill Gilonis, Tim Hodgkinson and Robert Wyatt
The Last Nightingale (1984, LP, Recommended Records, UK)
With News from Babel
Work Resumed on the Tower (1984, LP, Recommended Records, UK)
Letters Home (1986, LP, Recommended Records, UK)
With David Thomas and the Pedestrians
Winter Comes Home (1983, LP, Recommended Records, UK)
Variations on a Theme (1983, LP, Rough Trade Records, UK)
More Places Forever (1985, LP, Rough Trade Records, UK)
With Duck and Cover
Re Records Quarterly Vol.1 No.2 (1985, LP, Recommended Records UK)
Les 4 Guitaristes de l'Apocalypso-Bar
Tournée Mondiale/Été '89 (1987, LP, Ambiances Magnétiques, Canada)
Fin de Siècle (1989, LP, Ambiances Magnétiques, Canada)
With Peter Blegvad
Downtime (1988, LP, Recommended Records, UK)
Just Woke Up (1995, LP, Recommended Records, UK)
Hangman's Hill (1998, LP, Recommended Records, UK)
With Pere Ubu
The Tenement Year (1988, LP, Fontana Records)
Cloudland (1989, LP, Fontana Records)
 Worlds in Collision (1991, Fontanta; does not perform but credited as co-writer on three songs)
With HailKirk (1992, CD, Recommended Records, UK)
With Lutz GlandienDomestic Stories (1993, CD, Recommended Records, UK)Scenes From No Marriage (1994, CD, Recommended Records, UK)
With The (ec) NudesVanishing Point (1994, LP, Recommended Records, UK)
With p53p53 (1996, CD, Recommended Records, UK)
With BiotaObject Holder (1995, CD, Recommended Records, UK)
With Zeena ParkinsShark! (1996, CD, Recommended Records, UK)
With René Lussier and Jean DeromeThree Suite Piece (1996, CD, Recommended Records, UK)
With John Wolf Brennan
HeXtet: Through the Ear of a Raindrop (1998, CD, Leo Records, UK)
With Thomas DimuzioQuake (1999, CD, Recommended Records, UK)
With The Science GroupA Mere Coincidence (1999, CD, Recommended Records, UK)Spoors (2003, CD, Recommended Records, UK)
With Roberto Musci, Jon Rose and Claudio GabbianiSteel Water Light (2001, CD, Recommended Records, UK)
With VrilEffigies in Cork (2003, CD, Recommended Records, UK)The Fatal Duckpond (2009, CD, Recommended Records, UK)
With The Orckestra
"Unreleased Orckestra Extract" (3" CD single, 2006, Recommended Records, UK)
With Brainville 3Trial by Headline (2008, CD, Recommended Records, UK)
With Thomas Dimuzio and Fred FrithGolden State (2010, LP, Recommended Records, UK)
With Fred Frith and Tom CoraLive in Tel Aviv and Aubervilliers (2021, CD, Fred Records, UK)

SoloSolo: A Descent Into the Maelstrom (2001, CD, Recommended Records)Twice Around the World (2005, CD, Recommended Records)There and Back Again (2006, CD, Recommended Records)Compositions and Collaborations 1972-2022 (2023, box set, Recommended Records)

Bibliography

Cutler, Chris, ed. (2009). The Road: Volumes 1–5 (book from The 40th Anniversary Henry Cow Box Set). Recommended Records.
Cutler, Chris, ed. (2009). The Road: Volumes 6–10 (book from The 40th Anniversary Henry Cow Box Set). Recommended Records.
Cutler, Chris (2011). The Road to Plunderphonia. Quaderns d'àudio/Ràdio Web MACBA. .
Cutler, Chris (2020). Not as We Choose: Music, Memory and Technology.

FilmsAt the Edge of Chaos (2001, DVD) – 65 minute documentary (also known as 12 June 1998) by Shinji Aoyama on a Chris Cutler solo percussion concert in Tokyo, June 1998.Roulette TV Volume 8 (2003, DVD, Roulette) – live TV recording back-to-back with Shelley Hirsch, March 2001.

See also
Romantic Warriors II: A Progressive Music Saga About Rock in Opposition
Romantic Warriors II: Special Features DVD

Footnotes

References

Works cited

Further reading
Chris Cutler biography. Calyx: The Canterbury Website.

Perfect Sound Forever interview (03/1997)
"Resist Me, Make Me Strong – On Chris Cutler". Article by Patrick Wright published in The Guardian'', November 1995

Radio series PROBES for Museum of Contemporary Art of Barcelona (MACBA)
Interview (1998)
Chris Cutler interview (1998) (archived at the Internet Archive Wayback Machine)

External links

Chris Cutler homepage

 
1947 births
Living people
British male drummers
English rock drummers
English songwriters
English experimental musicians
Free improvisation
Canterbury scene
English music theorists
British music industry executives
Henry Cow members
Pere Ubu members
Gong (band) members
Art Bears members
News from Babel members
The Orckestra members